Carex albursina (White Bear sedge, blunt-scaled wood sedge) is a wide-leaved sedge. It grows in moist deciduous or mixed woods in eastern North America. It was named after White Bear Lake in east central Minnesota, where it was found by Edmund Sheldon in the 1890s.

References 

albursina
Plants described in 1792
Flora of Alabama